Erkki Antero Koiso (April 13, 1934 in Tampere, Finland – July 9, 2000) was a professional ice hockey player who played in the SM-liiga.  He played for Ilves.  He was inducted into the Finnish Hockey Hall of Fame in 1985.

External links
 Finnish Hockey Hall of Fame bio

1934 births
2000 deaths
Ice hockey players at the 1960 Winter Olympics
Ilves players
Olympic ice hockey players of Finland
Ice hockey people from Tampere